Učak is a small settlement in the Municipality of Lukovica, east of Šentožbolt and west of Trojane, in central Slovenia.

References

External links
 
Učak on Geopedia

Populated places in the Municipality of Lukovica